Per E. Larsson was head of the Sweden-based OM Group (now OMX) and served as a member of the board of Swedish Orc Software company before he became CEO of the Dubai International Financial Centre (DIFC) on 15 July 2006.

On 1 July 2008, Jeffery Singer (former NASDAQ senior vice president) was scheduled to replace Larsson as CEO of DIFX.

References

Living people
Swedish businesspeople
Swedish expatriates in the United Arab Emirates
Year of birth missing (living people)